Xion may refer to:

Xion (Bloody Roar), a character in the video game series
Xion (Kingdom Hearts), a character in the Organization XIII group

See also

 Shion (name)
 Sion (disambiguation)
 Zion (disambiguation)